Alucita habrophila is a species of moth of the family Alucitidae. It is known from South Africa.

References

Endemic moths of South Africa
Alucitidae
Moths of Africa
Moths described in 1920
Taxa named by Edward Meyrick